The 1990 Speedway World Team Cup was the 31st edition of the FIM Speedway World Team Cup to determine the team world champions.

The final was staged at Svítkov Stadion, Pardubice, Czechoslovakia and the United States won their second title.

Qualification

Group D

 April 22, 1990
  Gustrow
 ROUND 1

 May 1, 1990
  Ljubljana
 ROUND 2

Austria to Group C

Group C

 May 20, 1990
  Lonigo
 ROUND 1

 May 28, 1990
  Karhula
 ROUND 2

Finland to Group B.

Group B

 July 8, 1990
  Szeged
 ROUND 1

 July 14, 1990
  Gorzow
 ROUND 2

Australia to Group A.

Group A

 July 27, 1990
  Olching
 ROUND 1

 August 25, 1990
  Mariestad
 ROUND 2

USA to Final.

World Final

 September 16, 1990
  Pardubice, Svítkov Stadion

See also
 1990 Individual Speedway World Championship
 1990 Speedway World Pairs Championship

References

Speedway World Team Cup
1990 in speedway